Pelicana Chicken is a Korean fried chicken chain. Its headquarters are in Gyeryong, South Chungcheong Province, South Korea. As of 2014, Yang Hee-Kweon is the CEO. As of 2013, it had over 2,000 locations in South Korea and also has locations outside of South Korea. Pelicana Chicken Malaysia held its "soft opening" on January 4, 2013, and the company planned to hold the grand opening of the first full store in July 2013. The chain expanded to the United States in 2014, and has established locations in New York, New Jersey, Pennsylvania, Virginia and Washington. Pelicana has also opened in Mainland China. In 2022 it opened its first location in Canada, in Toronto.

References

External links
 Pelicana Chicken
 Pelicana Chicken 

Restaurants in South Korea
Companies based in South Chungcheong Province
Fast-food poultry restaurants
Korean restaurants